Business Aviation (airline) was an airline based in Kinshasa in the Democratic Republic of the Congo.

History
It was established in 1998 and operated scheduled domestic and international services, as well as charter flights and wet-lease services. Its main base was N'Dolo Airport, Kinshasa. In 2007, the airline was shut down.

The airline was on the List of air carriers banned in the European Union.

Destinations 
Business Aviation operated scheduled domestic passenger flights from Kinshasa, as well as international services to Brazzaville and Pointe-Noire.

Fleet 
The Business Aviation fleet included the following aircraft (as of 1 May 2008) :

1 Antonov An-32
1 Let L-410 UVP-E
1 McDonnell Douglas DC-9-34F (which was operated for Astral Aviation)
 Nord 262

See also		
 Transport in the Democratic Republic of the Congo

Bibliography

References

External links
Official website (defunct)
Business Aviation Fleet

Defunct airlines of the Democratic Republic of the Congo
Airlines established in 1998
Airlines disestablished in 2007
Companies based in Kinshasa